The River Pool is a river in the English county of Cumbria. The Pool rises at Waingap near the village of Crook and follows a southerly course, past the township of Underbarrow and into the Lyth Valley, where it joins the River Gilpin.

References 

Pool (Cumbria), River
2RiverPool